Montes is a municipality of Sucre, Venezuela. The capital is Cumanacoa.

Municipalities of Sucre (state)